Eber Edward Simpson (July 24, 1895 – December 19, 1964) was an American football, basketball and baseball player, football coach, and physician. He attended the University of Wisconsin–Madison, where he starred in football, basketball, and baseball. He also played college football at Washington University in St. Louis, from which he earned a medical degree.

Simpson played football professionally in the National Football League (NFL) for the St. Louis All-Stars in 1923. He practiced medicine in St. Louis for 35 years before retiring in 1955.

Biography
Simpson was born on July 24, 1895 in Oshkosh, Wisconsin. In 1919, he was appointed assistant football coach at Washington University in St. Louis under head football coach R. B. Rutherford. He coached football at East St. Louis Senior High School in East St. Louis, Illinois from 1922 to 1925.

Simpson died at his home in Oshkosh on December 19, 1964.

References

External links
 

1895 births
1964 deaths
20th-century American physicians
American men's basketball players
American football quarterbacks
St. Louis All-Stars players
Washington University Bears football coaches
Washington University Bears football players
Wisconsin Badgers baseball players
Wisconsin Badgers football players
Wisconsin Badgers men's basketball players
High school football coaches in Illinois
All-American college men's basketball players
Washington University School of Medicine alumni
People from Oshkosh, Wisconsin
Players of American football from Wisconsin
Basketball players from Wisconsin
Baseball players from Wisconsin
Physicians from Missouri